The Manhattan Beach Open is a beach volleyball tournament held annually during the summer in Manhattan Beach, California.  Held on the south side of the Manhattan Beach Pier, the Open is the only professional volleyball tournament in which amateurs are able to "place into" the event through pre-qualifying rounds.

The tournament began in 1960 starting as an amateur event and is now part of the professional volleyball players tour. Today the event is one of the largest on the AVP tour drawing an estimated 60,000 people. It is the longest-running and most prestigious beach volleyball tournament in the United States. 

Winners of the tournament are memorialized with bronze volleyball-shaped plaques in the "Volleyball Walk of Fame" mounted on the Manhattan Beach Pier.

Open Champions 

The record holder for the most tournament wins by a female is Kathy Gregory, with seven total bronze plaques on the "Volleyball Walk of Fame." For the men, it is Karch Kiraly, who has ten total plaques on the pier.

As of 2002 no game for third place was played for both sexes.

Women's results

Men's results

References

External links
 USA Volleyball event page
 List of past winners (5th paragraph)
 Association of Volleyball Professionals
 City of Manhattan Beach website for the Open

Association of Volleyball Professionals
Beach volleyball competitions
Beach volleyball competitions in the United States
Recurring sporting events established in 1960
Sports competitions in Manhattan Beach, California